Phineas' Rainbow is the second album by American jazz pianist Phineas Newborn Jr. recorded in 1956 and released on the RCA Victor label in February 1957.

Reception
The Allmusic review awarded the album 4 stars.

Track listing
All compositions by Phineas Newborn Jr. except as indicated
 "Overtime" – 3:45
 "Angel Eyes" (Earl Brent, Matt Dennis) – 4:19
 "Come to Baby, Do!" (Inez James, Sidney Miller) – 4:09
 "Stairway to the Stars" (Matty Malneck, Mitchell Parish, Frank Signorelli) – 5:22
 "Land's End" (Harold Land) – 5:21
 "Clarisse" – 4:37
 "She (She Means Everything to Me)" (George Shearing) – 4:22
 "Tin Tin Deo" (Gil Fuller, Dizzy Gillespie, Chano Pozo) – 4:20
 "Autumn in New York" (Vernon Duke) – 4:02
 "What Is This Thing Called Love?" (Cole Porter) – 6:09

Personnel
Phineas Newborn Jr. – piano
Calvin Newborn – guitar (tracks 1, 3, 5, 6, 8 & 10)
George Joyner – bass (tracks 1, 3, 5, 6, 8 & 10)
Philly Joe Jones – drums (tracks 1, 6 & 10)

References

RCA Records albums
Phineas Newborn Jr. albums
1957 albums